Juan Pablo Valencia González (born 2 May 1988) is a Colombian former professional racing cyclist. He was named in the start list for the 2015 Vuelta a España.

Major results

2010
 1st  Road race, National Under-23 Road Championships
2012
 2nd Giro del Veneto
 4th GP Capodarco
2015
 1st  Mountains classification Tour of Turkey

References

External links
 

1988 births
Living people
Colombian male cyclists
Sportspeople from Medellín